Sixteen European countries, along with Canada and Israel, have laws against Holocaust denial, the denial of the systematic genocidal killing of approximately six million Jews in Europe by Nazi Germany in the 1930s and 1940s. Many countries also have broader laws that criminalize genocide denial. Among the countries that ban Holocaust denial, Austria, Germany, Hungary, Poland and Romania also ban other elements associated with Nazism, such as the display of Nazi symbols.

Laws against Holocaust denial have been proposed in many other countries (in addition to those nations that have criminalized such acts) including the United States and the United Kingdom. Such proposed laws have been criticised and faced opposition, most significantly from civil rights and human rights advocates who contend that such laws would violate people's established rights of freedom of speech and freedom of expression. Organizations representing the groups victimized during the Holocaust have generally been split in opinion about such proposed laws.

Some courts in the United States, Germany and the United Kingdom have taken judicial notice that the Holocaust occurred.

Along with genocide denial, attempts to justify genocide are punishable in several countries.

Criticism and commentary 
Scholars have pointed out that countries that specifically ban Holocaust denial generally have legal systems that limit speech in other ways, such as banning "hate speech". According to D. D. Guttenplan, this is a split between the "common law countries of the United States, Ireland and many British Commonwealth countries from the civil law countries of continental Europe and Scotland. In civil law countries the law is generally more proscriptive. Also, under the civil law regime, the judge acts more as an inquisitor, gathering and presenting evidence as well as interpreting it". Michael Whine argues that Holocaust denial can inspire violence against Jews; he states, "Jews' experience in the post-World War II era suggests that their rights are best protected in open and tolerant democracies that actively prosecute all forms of racial and religious hatred".

János Kis and in particular András Schiffer feel the work of Holocaust deniers should be protected by a universal right to free speech. 
An identical argument was used by the Hungarian Constitutional Court (Alkotmánybíróság) led by László Sólyom when it struck down a law against Holocaust denial in 1992. The argument that laws punishing Holocaust denial are incompatible with the European Convention on Human Rights and the Universal Declaration of Human Rights have been rejected by institutions of the Council of Europe (the European Commission of Human Rights, the European Court of Human Rights) and also by the United Nations Human Rights Committee.

Historians who oppose such laws include Raul Hilberg, Richard J. Evans, Pierre Vidal-Naquet, and Timothy Garton Ash. Other prominent opponents include Christopher Hitchens, Peter Singer, and Noam Chomsky, who wrote:

It seems to me something of a scandal that it is even necessary to debate these issues two centuries after Voltaire defended the right of free expression for views he detested. It is a poor service to the memory of the victims of the holocaust to adopt a central doctrine of their murderers.

An uproar resulted when Serge Thion used one of Chomsky's essays without explicit permission as a foreword to a book of Holocaust denial essays (see Faurisson affair).

In January 2019, in an interview in The New Yorker in connection with the publication of her book, Antisemitism: Here and Now, Holocaust historian Deborah E. Lipstadt expressed her opposition to laws against expressing Holocaust denial:

I still am a firm opponent of laws against Holocaust denial. First of all, I'm a pretty fierce advocate of the First Amendment. Having been sued for libel, and having had that in my life for about six years, I'm more than ever. Even though libel is not covered by the First Amendment, [David Irving] wouldn't have been able to sue me in this country because he was a public figure.But I also don't think that these laws are efficacious. Forget the morality – I don't think they work. I think they turn whatever is being outlawed into forbidden fruit. We saw it in Germany, when Mein Kampf was released from the embargo on it a few years ago. People bought it because suddenly it was something they could get ahold of. I just don't think these laws work. And the third reason I'm opposed to them is I don't want politicians making a decision on what can and cannot be said. That scares me enormously.

These laws have also been criticized on the grounds that education is more effective than legislation at combating Holocaust denial and that the laws will make martyrs out of those imprisoned for their violation.

By country

Australia 
While Australia lacks a specific law against Holocaust denial, Holocaust denial is prosecuted in Australia under various laws against "hate speech" and "racial vilification". Fredrick Töben was found guilty at Australia's Federal Court of contempt in 2009 for not following a court order in 2002 to desist from publishing anti-semitic material on his Adelaide Institute website. The material queried whether the Holocaust happened, as well as the presence of gas chambers at the Auschwitz death camps.

Austria 
In Austria, the Verbotsgesetz 1947 provided the legal framework for the process of denazification in Austria and suppression of any potential revival of Nazism. In 1992, it was amended to prohibit the denial or gross minimisation of the Holocaust.

Belgium 
In Belgium, Holocaust denial was made illegal in 1995.

Bosnia and Herzegovina 
In May 2007 Ekrem Ajanovic, a Bosniak MP in the Bosnian Parliament proposed legislation on criminalizing denial of the Holocaust, genocide and crimes against humanity, the first time a lawmaker in Bosnia and Herzegovina had made such a suggestion. Bosnian Serb MPs voted against it, proposing issue should be resolved within the Criminal Code of Bosnia and Herzegovina. Following this, on 6 May 2009 Bosniak MPs Adem Huskic, Ekrem Ajanovic and Remzija Kadric proposed to parliament a change to the Criminal Code of Bosnia and Herzegovina where Holocaust, genocide and crimes against humanity denial would be criminalized. Bosnian Serb MPs have repeatedly been against such a legislation claiming that the law "would cause disagreement and even animosity" according to SNSD member Lazar Prodanovic.

On July 23, 2021, the High Representative of Bosnia and Herzegovina Valentin Inzko passed a law using the Bonn Powers given to him banning the denial of Genocides, Crimes against Humanity and War Crimes.

Brazil 
While holocaust denial is not explicitly prohibited in Brazilian law, precedents tend to lead to conviction. As of 11 February 2022, several bills criminalizing the act are pending in Congress.

Bulgaria 
In 2011, the Bulgarian Parliament passed amendment to the Bulgarian Criminal Code, introducing new art. 419a.

China
In the People's Republic of China, holocaust denial is illegal under advocating or glorifying wars of aggression or aggressive conduct, under the Law of the People's Republic of China on the Protection of Heroes and Martyrs.

Czech Republic 
In the Czech Republic, Holocaust denial and denial of communist-perpetrated atrocities is illegal.

France 
In France, the Gayssot Act, voted for on July 13, 1990, makes it illegal to question the existence of crimes that fall in the category of crimes against humanity as defined in the London Charter of 1945, on the basis of which Nazi leaders were convicted by the International Military Tribunal at Nuremberg in 1945–46. When the act was challenged by Robert Faurisson, the Human Rights Committee upheld it as a necessary means to counter possible antisemitism. Similarly, the applications of Pierre Marais and Roger Garaudy were rejected by the European Court of Human Rights, in 1996 and 2003.

In 2012, the Constitutional Council of France ruled that to extend the Gayssot Act to the Armenian genocide denial was unconstitutional because it violated the freedom of speech. The Gayssot Act itself, however, was found consistent with the Constitution four years later.

Germany

§ 130 Incitement to hatred 
In Germany, Volksverhetzung ("incitement of the people") is a concept in German criminal law that bans incitement to hatred against segments of the population. It often applies to (though not limited to) trials relating to Holocaust denial in Germany. In addition, Strafgesetzbuch § 86a outlaws various symbols of "unconstitutional organisations", such as Nazi symbolism or the ISIL flag.

The definition of section 6 of the Code of Crimes against International Law referenced in the above § 130 is as follows:

Other sections 
The following sections of the German criminal code are also relevant:

Judicial notice
The German Federal Supreme Court has, in at least one case, taken judicial notice that the Holocaust occurred.

Greece 
In September 2014, with a vote of 54 out of 99 present of the 300-member Hellenic Parliament (the body was in summer session at the time), Greece amended its 1979 law 'On the penalization of actions or activities intending unto racial discrimination' (N.927/1979) to make malicious denial of the Holocaust and other crimes against humanity for the purposes of inciting violence, discrimination or hatred or by way of threat or insult, a criminal offense. In contrast to other European countries, the Greek law is not a blanket ban on expressing the opinion that a genocide did not take place, but rather requires an additional condition of intending to cause violence, incite hatred or threaten or insult a protected group.

This law was harshly criticised at the time of its passage for its vague language and alleged infringement of freedom of expression. In a letter signed by 139 Greek historians, they argued that "as international experience has shown, such provisions lead down dangerous paths: they critically wound the democratic and inalienable right to freedom of speech, while simultaneously not being at all effective in terms of fighting racism and Nazism. Indeed, they often lead to the opposite result, allowing the enemies of democracy to present themselves to public opinion as "victims" of censorship and authoritarianism. The conditions set forth in the bill, being highly vague and fluid, are unfortunately not a guarantee."

The first prosecution under Article 2 of the law was brought against German historian Heinz A. Richter, who was tried in absentia for denying Nazi atrocities in Crete during World War II. The court found Richter not guilty on the grounds that, while his work was proven to contain historical inaccuracies, there was no evidence he intended to incite hatred against the people of Crete and that the 2014 law was unconstitutional, as it violated the principle of freedom of speech.  Though the finding of unconstitutionality is not finally binding, as it was issued by a court of first instance, as of March 2018, no one has been successfully convicted in Greece for genocide denial under this law.

Hungary 
The National Assembly of Hungary declared the denial or trivialization of the Holocaust a crime punishable by up to three years' imprisonment on February 23, 2010. The law was signed by President László Sólyom in March 2010. On June 8, 2010, the newly elected Fidesz-dominated parliament changed the formulation of the law to "punish those, who deny the genocides committed by national socialist or communist systems, or deny other facts of deeds against humanity".

In 2011, the first man was charged with Holocaust denial in Budapest. The Court sentenced the man to 18 months in prison, suspended for three years, and probation. He also had to visit either Budapest's memorial museum, Auschwitz or Yad Vashem in Jerusalem. He chose his local Holocaust Memorial Center and had to make three visits in total and record his observations.

In January 2015, the court ordered far-right on-line newspaper Kuruc.info to delete its article denying the Holocaust published in July 2013, which was the first ruling in Hungary of its kind. The Association for Civil Liberties (TASZ) offered free legal aid to the website as a protest against restrictions on freedom of speech, but the site refused citing the liberal views of the association, and also refused to delete the article.

Israel 
In Israel, a law to criminalize Holocaust denial was passed by the Knesset on July 8, 1986.

Italy 
The Italian parliament, extending an anti-racism law from 1975, approved Law 16 June 2016 n. 115, criminalizing the spreading of Holocaust denial and making conviction for the crime subject to imprisonment for two to six years.

Liechtenstein 
Although not specifically outlining national socialist crimes, item five of section 283 of Liechtenstein's criminal code prohibits the denial of genocide.

Lithuania 
In Lithuania, approval and denial of Nazi or Soviet crimes is prohibited.

Luxembourg 
In Luxembourg, Article 457-3 of the Criminal Code, Act of 19 July 1997 outlaws Holocaust denial and denial of other genocides. The punishment is imprisonment for between 8 days and 6 months and/or a fine. The offence of "negationism and revisionism" applies to:

Netherlands 
While Holocaust denial is not explicitly illegal in the Netherlands, the courts consider it a form of spreading hatred and therefore an offence. According to the Dutch public prosecution office, offensive remarks are only punishable by Dutch law if they equate to discrimination against a particular group. The relevant laws of the Dutch penal code are as follows:

Poland 
In Poland, Holocaust denial and the denial of communist crimes is punishable by law.

Portugal 
Although denial of the Holocaust is not expressly illegal in Portugal, Portuguese law prohibits denial of war crimes if used to incite to discrimination.

Romania 
In Romania, Emergency Ordinance No. 31 of March 13, 2002 prohibits Holocaust denial. It was ratified on May 6, 2006. The law also prohibits racist, fascist, xenophobic symbols, uniforms and gestures: proliferation of which is punishable with imprisonment from between six months to five years.

In 2021, the first sentence over Holocaust denial was made in Romania. The accused was Vasile Zărnescu, a former Romanian Intelligence Service (SRI) member who published several articles and a book against the veracity of the Holocaust.

Russia 

In May 2014, Russia's President Vladimir Putin signed a law making the denial of Nazi crimes and "wittingly spreading false information about the activity of the USSR during the years of World War Two" or portraying Nazis as heroes a criminal offence.

Slovakia 
In Slovakia, Holocaust denial has been a crime since 2001 (law 485/2001), and the penal law (300/2005) specifies in §422d that "who publicly denies, denies, approves or tries to justify the Holocaust, crimes of regimes based on fascist ideology, crimes of regimes based on communist ideology or crimes of other similar movements that use violence, the threat of violence or the threat of other serious harm with the aim of suppressing the fundamental rights and freedoms of persons shall be punished by imprisonment of six months to three years".

Spain 
Genocide denial was illegal in Spain until the Constitutional Court of Spain ruled that the words "deny or" were unconstitutional in its judgement of November 7, 2007. As a result, Holocaust denial is legal in Spain, although justifying the Holocaust or any other genocide is an offence punishable by imprisonment in accordance with the constitution.

Switzerland 
Holocaust denial is not expressly illegal in Switzerland, but the denial of genocide and other crimes against humanity is an imprisonable offence.

Ukraine
In September 2021, the Verkhovna Rada passed a law defining antisemitism and banning it in the country. This law includes denying the mass extermination of Jews in the Holocaust as part of its definition of antisemitism.

United Kingdom
There is no statute in the United Kingdom making Holocaust denial illegal, however judicial notice that the Holocaust occurred was taken in the case of R v Chabloz and the defendant in that case was charged with sharing 'grossly offensive' material related to Holocaust denial. Some contend that this judgement sets a precedent for Holocaust denial related material being deemed "grossly offensive" and contrary to the Communications Act 2003.

United States
In the United States, Holocaust denial is constitutionally protected free speech because of the First Amendment.

A United States court in 1981, in a case brought by Mel Mermelstein, took judicial notice of the occurrence of gassings in Auschwitz during the Holocaust, declaring that a legally incontestable fact.

Canada

The legality of Holocaust denial in Canada has come up in several court cases. In R v Zundel, the Supreme Court of Canada ruled that Ernst Zündel, a German-born immigrant, who was a prolific Holocaust denier, could not be convicted for “spreading of false news”, as it would be against Canada's Charter guarantee of free expression.

According to The Canadian Press, the federal government announced a bill in 2022 that will change the Criminal Code to outlaw Holocaust denial and similar forms of antisemitic hate speech.

As of June 23, 2022, the willful promotion of antisemitism is illegal in Canada. Persons found guilty of wilfully promoting antisemitism by "condoning, denying or downplaying the Holocaust" may receive a prison sentence not more than 2 years or a summary conviction.

European Union
The European Union's Executive Commission proposed a European Union-wide anti-racism xenophobia law in 2001, which included the criminalization of Holocaust denial. On July 15, 1996, the Council of the European Union adopted the Joint action/96/443/JHA concerning action to combat racism and xenophobia. During the German presidency there was an attempt to extend this ban. Full implementation was blocked by the United Kingdom and the Nordic countries because of the need to balance the restrictions on voicing racist opinions against the freedom of expression. As a result, a compromise has been reached within the EU and while the EU has not prohibited Holocaust denial outright, a maximum term of three years in jail is optionally available to all member nations for "denying or grossly trivialising crimes of genocide, crimes against humanity and war crimes".

The EU extradition policy regarding Holocaust denial was tested in the UK during the 2008 failed extradition case brought against the suspected Holocaust denier Fredrick Töben by the German government. As there is no specific crime of Holocaust denial in the UK, the German government had applied for Töben's extradition for racial and xenophobic crimes. Töben's extradition was refused by the Westminster Magistrates' Court, and the German government withdrew its appeal to the High Court.

2019 European Court of Human Rights decision 
On October 3, 2019, in the case Pastörs v. Germany (application no. 55225/14), the European Court of Human Rights (ECHR) unanimously ruled that a decision of the German courts determining that the statement made by the German politician, Udo Pastörs, that "the so-called Holocaust is being used for political and commercial purposes" as well as other Holocaust denial comments were a violation of the memory of the dead and an intentional defamation of the Jewish people and that the courts had not violated Article 10 (freedom of expression) of the European Convention on Human Rights in convicting him for this offense. Furthermore, the ECHR decided by four votes to three that there had been no violation of Article 6 § 1 (right to a fair trial) of the European Convention on Human Rights.

Prosecutions and convictions 
Laws against Holocaust denial have been enforced in most jurisdictions that have them. Convictions and sentencings include:

See also 

Anti-fascism
Criticism of Holocaust denial
Freedom of expression
Genocide recognition politics
Thoughtcrime
Secondary antisemitism
Armenian genocide denial#Legality
Rwandan genocide denial, which is illegal in Rwanda

References

External links 
 Jonathan Josephs, Holocaust Denial Legislation – A justifiable infringement of freedom of speech? (Université Libre de Bruxelles; Working Papers du Centre Perelman de philosophie du droit, n° 2008/3) 
 Voices on Antisemitism Interview with Brigitte Zypries from the U.S. Holocaust Memorial Museum

Holocaust studies
Holocaust denial
Holocaust denial
Holocaust denial in Israel
Holocaust denial in the European Union